Sivelestat (INN, research name ONO 5046, marketed as Elaspol) is an inhibitor of human neutrophil elastase.

It is used in the treatment of acute respiratory failure and preliminary studies show it may also improve neuropathic pain.

Synthesis
Sivelestat is synthesised as follows:

References

Benzamides
Hydrolase inhibitors
Sulfonamides
Pivalate esters